Henry Moyo may refer to:

Henry Moyo (runner) (born 1972), Malawian Olympic long-distance runner
Henry Moyo (football) (1946–2012), Malawian football coach